Ewen (or Ewan) Cameron may refer to:

People in Scottish Clan Cameron 

Ewen MacAllan Cameron, 10th Chief, see Chiefs of Clan Cameron
Ewen 'Beag' Cameron of Lochiel, 14th Chief, see Chiefs of Clan Cameron
Sir Ewen Cameron of Lochiel (1629–1719), 17th Chief

Politicians 
Ewen Hugh Cameron (1831–1915), member for Evelyn in the Victorian Legislative Assembly from 1874 to 1914
Ewen Cameron (Victorian politician) (1860–1906), member for Portland (1900–1904) and Glenelg (1904–1906) in the Victorian Legislative Assembly
Ewen Paul Cameron (1891–1964), member for East Yarra Province in the Victorian Legislative Council 1948–1964 and Health Minister
Ewen Cameron (Australian politician) (born 1930), former Australian federal MP, member for Indi 1977–1993

Other people 
Sir Ewen Cameron, 1st Baronet (1740–1828), of Cameron baronets, of Fassiefern
Ewen Cameron (banker) (1841–1908), Scots-born Chairman of the Hong Kong and Shanghai Banking Corporation
Ewen Cameron, Baron Cameron of Dillington (born 1949), member of the House of Lords
Ewen Cameron (cricketer) (1921–1997), New Zealand cricketer
Ewen Cameron (presenter) (born 1973), Scottish radio DJ and television presenter
Ewen Cameron (soldier) (1811–1843), Scots-born Texan Army officer
Ewen Donald Cameron (born 1926), Anglican prelate in Australia
Ewen Wallace Cameron (1816–1876), Australian businessman

See also
 Donald Ewen Cameron (1901–1967), Scottish-born psychiatrist
Ewan Cameron (1922–1991), Scottish physician
Ewan Cameron (fl. 2000s), Scottish television critic for the Evening Express
Ewan Cameron (fl. 2000s), Scottish architect and designer of Capel Manor, Kent